Daniel Harries (born 22 March 1983 in Townsville, Australia) is an Australian figure skater. He is the 2002 Australian national bronze medalist and the 2004 national silver medalist. His highest placement at an ISU Championship was 14th at the 2004 Four Continents Championships.

Competitive highlights

 J = Junior level

External links
 

Australian male single skaters
1983 births
Living people
Sportspeople from Townsville